Willow Creek Township is located in Lee County, Illinois. As of the 2010 census, its population was 688 and it contained 277 housing units. Willow Creek Township was formed from Wyoming Township in September, 1854.

Geography

References

External links
US Census
City-data.com
Cook County Official Site
Illinois State Archives
Google Map of Willow Creek Township, Lee County IL

Townships in Lee County, Illinois
1854 establishments in Illinois
Populated places established in 1854
Townships in Illinois